Colonel Dubhaltach Caoch Mac Coisdealbhaigh, Irish soldier and Rapparee, died on Sunday 3 March 1667.

Life
Mac Coisdealbhaigh was a member of the Costello family of Connacht. His brother was the soldier and poet, Tomás Láidir Mac Coisdealbhaigh.

Dudley (or Dubhaltach) Costello was an officer in the army of the Confederate Catholics in 1642, and later became a colonel in the Spanish army. Returning to Ireland after the Restoration and disappointed by his failure to recover the family estates, he devoted the rest of his life to wreaking vengeance on the new Dillon proprietors. Proclaimed a tory and a rebel in the summer of 1666, Mac Coisdealbhaigh "carried out a vendetta of raids and burnings against Viscount Dillon in the baronies of Costello and Gallen, in east Mayo, until he was shot dead by the soldiers of Captain Theobald Dillon in Coolcarney ... Bunnyconnellan, early in March 1667." (p. 236). His head was hung from the St. James Gate in Dublin, today the home of Guinness.

He is featured in Dubhaltach Mac Fhirbhisigh's Leabhar na nGenealach at 827.2, as Dubhaltach Caoch, and in his Cuimre (1416.1) as Dubhaltach Colonel, mac Suirtain Buidhe Mec Goisdelbh.

A 19th-century namesake and kinsman was Dudley Costello.

Clann Coisdealbhaigh (after Mac Fhirbhisigh)

   Jocelyn de Angulo, fl. 1172.
   |
   |
   William de Angulo, aka William Mac Coisdealbhaigh
   |
   |
   Miles Bregach Mac Coisdealbhaigh
   |
   |__
   |                   |                        |
   |                   |                        |
   Hugo, d. 1266?      Gilbert Mor              Phillip, fl. 1288.
   |                   |                        |
   |                   |                        |
   Jordan, d. 1324?    Gilbert Og, k. 1333.     |              |
   |                   |                        |              |
   |                   |                        Jordan Duff    Baldraithe/Baldrin
   John.               John, fl. 1366.          |              |
                       |                    Mac Jordan Duff    Mac Phillip
                       |
                       Jordan na Bertaighecht
                       |
    ___|_
    |                               |
    |                               |
    Edmond an Machaire, k. 1437.    William
    |
    |_
    |                                   |                                                                            |
    |                                   |                                                                            |
    John Duff, d. 1487.                 William                                                                    Walter
    |                                   |                                                                            |
    |                                   |_               |
    Gilleduff                           |                  |                     |               |                 |
    |                                   |                  |                     |               |                 |
    |_                  Walter, k. 1545    John Dubh, fl. 1536.  Jordan Glegil   Hubert            John
    |                |                  |                  |                     |               |                 |
    |                |                  |                  |                     |               |                 |___
    Jordan           John, k. 1536      Rudhraighe         Piers, k. 1555.       William     Gilladuff             |         |
    |                |                                     |                     |               |                 |         |
    |                |                                     |                     |               |    Thomas     Jordan Boy
    Jordan Buidhe    Jordan                                William               David           |     |     |      |        |
    |                |                                     |                     |               |     |     |      |        |
    |                |___     _|            _|  Edmond John  Walter David  Dubhaltach
    Edmond           |      |               |     |        |            |        |           |        fl. 1586.              |
                     |      |               |     David    Richard      |        |           |                               |
                     John   Jordan Buidhe   William Caech               Edmond   William   Calvach                   Jordan Boy, fl. 1585
                                              k. 1589                                                                        |
    _|
    |                                                      |                           |                                     |
    |                                                      |                           |                                     |
   Tomás Láidir Mac Coisdealbhaigh  Dubhaltach Caoch Mac Coisdealbhaigh                Edmond Dubh                    Calbhach Ban
       fl. 1660s.                         killed 3 March 1667.

References

 The Celebrated Antiquary, p. 236, p. 279, Nollaig Ó Muraíle, Maynooth, 1996.

1667 deaths
17th-century Irish people
Irish outlaws
Irish soldiers
Military personnel from County Mayo
Year of birth unknown]